Yves Simon Pambou Loembet (born 27 November 1995) is a professional footballer who plays as a midfielder for Gaz Metan Mediaș. Born in France, he represents Congo at international level.

Club career
After playing for FC Nantes' youth system, Pambou moved to Italy, joining Serie B side Reggina Calcio in July 2013.

After six months with Hapoel Petach Tikva, he signed a contract of one year and half with Grenoble Foot 38 in January 2019.

International career
Pambou made his debut for the Congo national football team in a 1–1 2018 FIFA World Cup qualification tie with Ghana on 1 September 2017.

References

External links

1995 births
Living people
People from Montfermeil
Footballers from Seine-Saint-Denis
Republic of the Congo footballers
Republic of the Congo international footballers
Naturalized citizens of France
French footballers
French sportspeople of Republic of the Congo descent
Association football midfielders
Serie B players
Reggina 1914 players
Trélissac FC players
FC DAC 1904 Dunajská Streda players
Slovak Super Liga players
Liga Leumit players
Hapoel Petah Tikva F.C. players
Ligue 2 players
Grenoble Foot 38 players
Liga I players
CS Gaz Metan Mediaș players
Republic of the Congo expatriate footballers
Expatriate footballers in Italy
Republic of the Congo expatriate sportspeople in Italy
Expatriate footballers in Slovakia
Republic of the Congo expatriate sportspeople in Slovakia
Expatriate footballers in Israel
Republic of the Congo expatriate sportspeople in Israel
Expatriate footballers in Romania
Republic of the Congo expatriate sportspeople in Romania
French expatriate footballers
French expatriate sportspeople in Italy
French expatriate sportspeople in Slovakia
French expatriate sportspeople in Israel
French expatriate sportspeople in Romania